Boomi may refer to:

Places 
Boomi, New South Wales, a town in Australia
Boomi River, in New South Wales, Australia
Boomi Shire, a local government area in New South Wales, Australia

Films 
Boomi Malayalam, a 2009 Malayalam film
Pudhiya Boomi, a 1968 Indian Tamil film 
Punniya Boomi, a 1978 Indian Tamil film
Sethu Boomi, a 2016 Indian Tamil film

Other uses 
Boomi, LP, an American technology company

See also 

Bhoomi (disambiguation)
Bhumi (disambiguation)
Boomie Richman (1921–2016), American saxophone player